The Basilica of Saint Mary of the Arches, is a paleochristian temple, which dates back to the 5th century, located  on the outskirts of Tricio, in La Rioja (Spain). Other historians like Caballero, Arce and Utrero propose the hypothesis that it was built during the Reconquista in the 9th or 10th century based on technical and historical considerations.

It was built over a Roman mausoleum of the 3rd century, reusing a number of pieces of this and other buildings of the ancient Roman city of Tritium Megalon.

References

External links 
 Basílica de Santa María de los Arcos (Tricio, La Rioja), pps file (es)
 360º Panorama of the Basilica of Saint Mary of the Arches - Amigos de Sta. María de Arcos y Tricio

Bien de Interés Cultural landmarks in La Rioja (Spain)
Roman temples in Spain